Márton Fucsovics was the defending champion but chose not to defend his title.

Sergiy Stakhovsky won the title after defeating Oscar Otte 6–4, 6–4 in the final.

Seeds

Draw

Finals

Top half

Bottom half

References
Main Draw
Qualifying Draw

Fuzion 100 Ilkley Trophy - Men's Singles
2018 Men's Singles